New Hampshire Ramblers were an American soccer club. In 1995, the club was originally called the Montreal Ramblers, but were forced to move by FIFA before playing any games.  They are most notable for having Khalil Azmi as their goalkeeper.

The semi-professional soccer club was founded in the late 1980s as Ramblers de Montreal by Noel Okorougo,
financier and sports rights agent who succeeded Pascal Cifarelli as President of Ligue National du Soccer
Quebec (LNSQ) and was also former  Commissioner East  of Canadian National Soccer League (CNSL) 1, 2 .
During its years in LNSQ and CNSL Ramblers de Montreal played its home games at the Montreal Olympic
Stadium annex in a highly competitive semi-professional league that included clubs such as Toronto Italia and
Toronto Croatia both with huge ethnic support base.

At the end of the 1994 FIFA World Cup in USA, Ramblers de Montreal fortified its squad by signing Khalil
Azmi 3,4 , goalkeeper of Morocco National team in USA World Cup 1994 as well as other African and South
American players with professional soccer experience. With higher quality players, some with World Cup and
professional football experience, Montreal Ramblers quickly outgrew the competition available in its domestic
league. In addition, the pool of professional soccer players and fan base in Montreal was not large enough to
accommodate a semi-professional club alongside a professional team Impact de Montreal owned and financed by
Saputo family and favored by the establishment in Quebec. Ramblers de Montreal made a cross border move to
USA in 1995 as a USISL expansion franchise called New Hampshire Ramblers. Soccer authorities in Canada
initially refused to grant Ramblers the right to relocate the semi-professional football franchise. 5,6.

The move of Ramblers FC franchise from Canada to US destroyed its progress on the field as many important
players could not move to USA either because of work permits or ties to Montreal. The club was dealt a final
blow when its original founder and patron Noel Okorougo departed to Europe in 1995 to work on Nike’s
Football aspirations in Africa. The USISL franchise lasted only one season in USA finishing 5th ahead of
Connecticut Wolves and Boston Storm in Division 3 Pro League Capital Conference which also featured New
York Fever, North Jersey Imperials, Pennsylvania Freedom and Albany Alleycats. 7 . Subsequently, John Motta
converted the residue of the club to form New Hampshire Phantoms 5,6.

Year-by-year

1995 Roster
Goalkeepers
 Khalil Azmi
 Scott Marshall

Defenders
 Joel Ogbunamiri
  Jerry Cipriani
 Sinali Coulibaly
 Zold Lajos
 Tom Wicker
 Sebastian Nedelcu

Midfielders
 Torrance Colvin
 David Trickett
 Jean Robert Toussaint
 Thomas Kowsz
 Reggie Drew

Forwards
 Marcello Tapia
 Kevin Halid
 Edin Dukić
 James Dedeus
 Mostafa Sahrane
 Khalid Choukr
 Paul Daccobert

Head coach
 Pierre Mindru

References

1 Histoire de la LSEQ 
2 Marc Tougas “Un peu de respect s-v-p” 
3 FIFA World Cup 1994 Team Morocco 
4 Morocco goal keeper is carried off the field 
5 New Hampshire Ramblers 
6 New Hampshire Ramblers vs Albany 
7 USL – 2 History in 2013 USL Media Guide, p. 148 
8 https://groups.google.com/forum/#!topic/rec.sport.soccer/qQyBbzvXeDo

Defunct soccer clubs in New Hampshire
USISL teams
1995 establishments in New Hampshire
1995 disestablishments in New Hampshire
Soccer clubs in New Hampshire
Association football clubs established in 1995
Association football clubs disestablished in 1995